Port of Antwerp-Bruges is the port authority that manages the ports of Antwerp and Bruges (Zeebrugge) since the merger between the port companies of both ports in 2022. It is a limited liability company of public law with the City of Antwerp and the City of Bruges as its shareholders.

References

Antwerp-Bruges
Ports and harbours of the North Sea